"Honey in the Rock" is a song by New Zealand singer-songwriter Brooke Ligertwood and American contemporary worship musician Brandon Lake. It impacted Christian radio stations in the United States on 25 March 2022, becoming the second single from Ligertwood's first live album, Seven (2022). Brooke Ligertwood and Brandon Lake co-wrote the song with Mitch Wong. The single was produced by Brooke Ligertwood and Jason Ingram.

"Honey in the Rock" peaked at number seven on the US Hot Christian Songs chart.

Background
On 25 February 2022, Brooke Ligertwood announced that "Honey in the Rock" with Brandon Lake would be the second single from her live album, Seven (2022), releasing its music video that same day. "Honey in the Rock" impacted Christian radio stations in the United States on 25 March 2022. On 1 July 2022, Ligertwood released a multi-track single of "Honey in the Rock" on digital platforms.

Ligertwood shared the story behind the song, saying:  Ligertwood's reference here is incorrect; mention of honey from the rock is found in Psalm 81.

Composition

Critical reception
In a NewReleaseToday review, Jasmine Patterson opined that the song is "the perfect Contemporary meets Gospel moment and it will take you straight to church. It’s a joyful declaration of God’s faithful provision in our lives, and the lyrics reference well-known Old Testament stories of miraculous provision." Gerod Bass of Worship Musician magazine wrote in his review: "The groovy southern rocker uses the experiences of the Israelites in the desert to remind us that God always provides for His people." Reviewing for 365 Days of Inspiring Media, Jonathan Andre congratulated Ligertwood for the song, saying "Well done Brooke for this track, a song that that can hopefully break down boundaries between CCM and…well, everything else."

Commercial performance
"Honey in the Rock" debuted at number 40 on the US Hot Christian Songs chart dated 12 March 2022, concurrently charting at number ten on the Christian Digital Song Sales chart.

"Honey in the Rock" debuted at number 43 on the US Christian Airplay chart dated 19 March 2022.

Music videos
On 25 February 2022, Brooke Ligertwood released the live performance video of "Honey in the Rock" with Brandon Lake via YouTube. The live performance video was recorded on 11 November 2021, at The Belonging Co, a church in Nashville, Tennessee. Ligertwood also published the lyric video of the song via YouTube on the same day, as well as the official acoustic performance video of the song. On 23 August 2022, Passion released the live performance video of the song with Ligertwood and Lake leading it in concert at Passion 2022 conference.

Performances
On 14 March 2022, Brooke Ligertwood and Brandon Lake performed on "Honey in the Rock" on The Kelly Clarkson Show.

Track listing

Personnel
Adapted from AllMusic.

 Josh Bailey — A&R
 Jonathan Baines — vocals
 Lorenzo Baylor — vocals
 Natalie Brown — vocals
 Jonathan Buffum — engineer
 Cassie Campbell — bass
 Angelique Carter — vocals
 Tamar Chipp — vocals
 Taylor Clarke — mixing
 David Dennis — vocals
 Emily Douglas — vocals
 Jackson Dreyer — vocals
 Katelyn Drye — vocals
 Jon Duke — executive producer, producer
 Ernesto Edwards — electric guitar 
 Enaka Enyong — vocals
 Jenna Lee Fair — vocals
 Luke Fredrickson — mixing
 David Funk — keyboards, programmer
 Sarah Gerald — vocals
 Sam Gibson — mixing
 Louie Giglio — executive producer, roducer
 Shelley Giglio— executive producer, producer
 Olivia Grasso — vocals
 Ainslie Grosser — recording
 Cecily Hennigan — vocals
 Jason Ingram — engineer, producer, programmer
 Nicole Johnson — vocals
 Carrie Karpinen — A&R
 Benji Kurokose — vocals
 Brandon Lake — acoustic guitar, Hammond B3, primary artist, vocals
 Shantrice Laura — vocals
 Drew Lavyne — mastering engineer
 Jonathan Lee — electric guitar, guitar
 Brooke Ligertwood — acoustic guitar, guitar, keyboards, primary artist, producer, vocals
 Allison Marin — strings
 Antonio Marin — strings
 Daniella Mason— background vocals, choir arrangement
 Daniel McMurray — drums
 Jonathan Mix — engineer
 Noah Moreno — vocals
 Brecken Myers — vocals
 Angela Nasby — vocals
 Passion — primary artist, producer
 Jordyn Pierce — vocals
 Marci Pruzina — vocals
 Christine Rhee — vocals
 Andrea Roth — A&R
 Emily Ruff — vocals
 Rylee Scott — vocals
 Zack Smith — vocals
 Cheryl Stark — vocals
 Keithon Stribling — vocals
 Dylan Thomas — guitar
 Bria Valderrama — vocals
 Robby Valderrama — vocals
 David Whitworth — drums
 John Wilds — vocals
 Mitch Wong — vocals
 Steph Wong — vocals

Charts

Weekly charts

Year-end charts

Release history

References

External links
 
 

2022 singles
2022 songs
Brooke Fraser songs
Brandon Lake songs
Sparrow Records singles
Songs written by Brooke Fraser
Songs written by Brandon Lake